James Willie Wright (born September 1, 1956) is a former professional American football player who played tight end for seven seasons for the Atlanta Falcons and the Denver Broncos.

Wright played special teams for Atlanta in 1978 before finding himself with the Denver Broncos by 1980.  After being mostly a bystander, Wright found his role grow under new head coach Dan Reeves starting in 1982.  His best, and final, season came in 1985 when he started twelve games for the Broncos and recorded 28 catches for 246 yards and a touchdown.

1956 births
Living people
American football tight ends
Atlanta Falcons players
Blinn Buccaneers football players
Denver Broncos players
TCU Horned Frogs football players
People from Fort Hood, Texas
Players of American football from Texas